Lauren Windsor is an American advocacy journalist and political consultant. She focuses primarily on Wall Street reform, money-in-politics corruption, and climate change. As the executive director of American Family Voices, she supports on pocketbook economic issues for the working and middle classes. Windsor is a partner in Democracy Partners and Mike Lux Media. She was also the deputy communications director for the Tom Steyer 2020 presidential campaign.

Early life and education

Windsor grew up in Nashville, Tennessee, and graduated from Middle Tennessee State University with a Bachelor of Business Administration in 2006. She earned an associate's degree in broadcast programming and production from Santa Monica College in 2013.

Career

Windsor began her career in politics as a Wall Street and campaign finance reform activist in the Occupy Wall Street movement and with the Money Out Voters In Coalition in Los Angeles. She traveled around the country documenting protests and met her mentor, Robert Creamer, who founded Democracy Partners, where she is now a partner.

Windsor is the creator of The Undercurrent, a field reporting web show launched with The Young Turks Network in 2012. The Undercurrent has covered the Koch brothers' donor retreats, efforts to overturn the 2020 U.S. presidential election, and the operations of James O'Keefe and Project Veritas. Her investigation of the 2014 Koch brothers' summer donor retreat was featured in Jane Mayer's book on the Koch brothers, Dark Money.

In 2020, Windsor spent six weeks in Georgia covering the Senate special elections, covering politicians such as Rudy Giuliani, then-Senator-elect Tommy Tuberville, and then-Senator David Perdue. The Undercurrent was the first outlet to disclose that any U.S. senators would be joining Republican House Members in challenging the Electoral College results.

Windsor also created the investigative website Project Veritas Exposed (PVE), which serves as a research hub for journalists, progressive movement activists, organizations, and campaigns. PVE's research has been featured in The New York Times, Washington Post, The Daily Beast, The Intercept, and other outlets.
On October 29, 2021 Windsor admitted  helping to coordinate a hoax (false flag) in which 5 fake white supremacists pretended to be republican Glenn Youngkin supporters a few days before Virginia's election day.

Windsor is a contributor to Huffington Post, DailyKos, and The Nation.  She also runs her own blog, Lady Libertine, and her videos have appeared on The Rachel Maddow Show, All In with Chris Hayes, The Ed Show, The Lead with Jake Tapper, and RT.

Many of her practices have drawn comparisons to the right-wing Project Veritas, but she says they are differences, saying that she doesn't use embedded moles like they do.

See also
American Family Voices
Robert Creamer (political consultant)

References

Living people
People from Nashville, Tennessee
American political consultants
Middle Tennessee State University alumni
Year of birth missing (living people)